Denison Barracks is a military installation at Hermitage in Berkshire, England.

History
The site was used as an American military hospital during the Second World War and became the home of Royal School of Military Survey in 1949. The barracks were named after General Sir William Denison, a prominent Royal Engineer. In order to consolidate all survey activities in one location, the rest of the Military Survey organisation moved to the site in the 1960s. 42 Engineer Regiment (Geographic) were formed at the barracks in 1987.

In March 2013 the Ministry of Defence announced a £10 million investment to allow the Military Stabilisation Support Unit, the Defence Cultural Specialist Unit, Land Intelligence Fusion Centre and 15 Psychological Operations Group to move onto the site. In July 2014 42 Engineer Regiment (Geographic) left the barracks and moved to RAF Wyton. 77th Brigade moved to the site and became fully operational in April 2015.

References

Barracks in England
Buildings and structures in Berkshire
Installations of the British Army
Military history of Berkshire
Chieveley